A demitasse (French: "half cup"), demi-tasse, or espresso cup is a small cup used to serve espresso. It may also refer to the coffee served in such a cup, though that usage had disappeared in France by the early 20th century.

The Italian Espresso National Institute recommends serving espresso in a white china cup holding 50−100 ml. They are typically ceramic and accompanied by matching saucers, but some coffeehouses and china companies also produce brightly decorated varieties. Another type of demitasse has a glass cup set into a metal frame, called a zarf.

Demitasse cups are small because they usually serve espresso, which is a stronger, more concentrated coffee, best served in smaller portions.

See also 
 Demitasse spoon

References

Drinkware
Coffee preparation
Espresso